The Hong Kong Open is a darts tournament held in Kowloon, Hong Kong, currently sanctioned by the World Darts Federation. It was established in 1989, being one of the oldest and important darts tournament in the East Asia region.

List of winners

Men's

Women's

References

External links
Hong Kong Darts Association website

Darts tournaments
Darts in China
Recurring sporting events established in 1989
1989 establishments in Hong Kong